This is a list of all current crossings of the river Dnieper (or Dnipro) from its source in Russia, through Belarus, to its river delta near the Dnieper Estuary at Kherson, Ukraine.

Russia

Belarus

Ukraine

References

External links 

 
Dnieper
Kyiv-related lists
Dnieper
Dnieper
 Crossings
Crossings
Dnieper River
Dnieper River